Greg Gay (born April 2, 1952, in Missouri) is a former member of the House of Representatives of the U.S. state of Florida, representing the Cape Coral area. He received his bachelor's degree from Florida State University in 1978.

References

External links
Official Bio for Representative Gay

Florida State University alumni
Republican Party members of the Florida House of Representatives
1952 births
Living people